Ohio elected its members October 10, 1820.

See also 
 1821 Ohio's 4th congressional district special election
 1820 and 1821 United States House of Representatives elections
 List of United States representatives from Ohio

Notes 

1820
Ohio
United States House of Representatives